Govindpur is a village of Ballia district in the Indian state of Uttar Pradesh. Its population is 469, per the 2011 Census. Govindpur village is located in Ballia Tehsil of Ballia district in Uttar Pradesh, India.

References 

Villages in Ballia district